In the 2008–09 season, Trabzonspor finished in third place in the Süper Lig. The top scorer of the team was Gökhan Ünal, who scored sixteen goals.

This article shows statistics of the club's players and matches during the season.

Sponsor
Avea

Players

Süper Lig

Turkish Cup

|}

See also
2008–09 Süper Lig
2008–09 Turkish Cup

References

Turkish football clubs 2008–09 season
Trabzonspor seasons